Welcome to Wherever You Are is the eighth studio album by Australian rock band INXS, which was released on 3 August 1992. With grunge and alternative music breaking into the mainstream, INXS tried to establish a new direction for itself, incorporating sitars, a 60-piece orchestra, and a much more "raw" sound to their music. In its four star review of the album, Q called it "... a far more engaging and heartfelt collection than anything the group has put out in recent memory ... It rocks," and listed it as one of the 50 Best Albums of 1992. It was the first album by an Australian artist to debut on the UK album chart at number one since AC/DC's "Back in Black".

Despite the positive critical reception, along with charting well on most countries' album charts (including topping the UK chart and reaching number two in Australia), the album marked a commercial decline for the band, especially in the United States, where it only peaked at number 16 on the Billboard 200 album chart. The commercial decline was partially due to the lack of promotion by their label and changing musical tastes towards grunge and alternative. Also hurting promotions, the band elected to take a break and not tour in support of the album. The plan was that the band would instead record the follow-up (which went on to become 1993's Full Moon, Dirty Hearts) and then tour in support of both albums. The downside of this, however, was that Welcome to Wherever You Are faded from press and public attention more quickly, and, as a result, failed to match the success of INXS's two previous albums, Kick and X.

While the single "Baby Don't Cry" was a Top 20 hit in the UK, the album's biggest American hit was "Not Enough Time", which reached No. 2 on the Billboard Modern Rock Tracks chart and stayed there for five consecutive weeks.

In 2002, a remastered version of the album was released, which included five previously unreleased tracks.

Background
Following the release of their seventh studio album, X, INXS staged a worldwide concert tour titled the X-Factor Tour. The ten-month tour began in October 1990 and consisted of four legs with a total of 121 shows. The 1990-91 tour proved successful, attracting 1.2 million fans across four continents. To coincide with the successful tour, INXS released their first live album, Live Baby Live, a few months after the tour had finished. Live Baby Live features 15 live tracks taken from various shows during the band's Summer XS leg of the tour. Although the album was commercially successful, peaking in the top 10 on both the Australian and UK album charts, as well as earning platinum status in the United States, some critics criticized the album for sounding too studio-like.

The members of INXS began preparations for their eighth studio album towards the end of the X tour. Songwriter and multi-instrumentalist Andrew Farriss had already written a number of songs while the band was on the road, including Shining Star, which was quickly recorded and added to the Live Baby Live album as a bonus studio track. Once the band got back to Australia, the song-writing duo of Farriss and vocalist Michael Hutchence paired up to begin writing new material. Rehearsals for Welcome to Wherever You Are soon took place at the Sydney Opera House in Sydney, NSW, Australia.

Recording and production
In November 1991, INXS entered Rhinoceros studios in Sydney, Australia to begin work on their eighth studio album. With no time constraints and enough money to make new studio recordings, the band members continued writing new material and experimenting with new sounds. Having worked with producer Chris Thomas previously on Listen Like Thieves, Kick and X, the band chose to work with Australian producer
Mark Opitz, who was behind the production of the band's third studio album, Shabooh Shoobah, ten years earlier. For this album, INXS decided to shift their musical direction by incorporating a much "rawer" sound. To achieve this, a variety of techniques were used during production, such as stripping down the polished sound that was present on their previous albums with Thomas. Heavy distortion was used on the guitars. Opitz and Hutchence also used heavy distortion on the vocals, an experience that Hutchence enjoyed. In a 1992 radio interview promoting the release of Welcome to Wherever You Are, guitarist Tim Farriss recalls the same technique used in producing music in the 1960s: "Sometimes they used to mix the vocal back so the band would sound louder, punchier and harder".

The album includes the work and sound of the Australian Concert orchestra on the songs "Baby Don't Cry" and "Men and Women". The band recorded both tracks live in the studio, with the 60-piece orchestra being conducted by Colin Piper and engineered by Neil Sandbach. For the opening track "Questions", guitarist and saxophonist Kirk Pengilly used a brass horn to create a Far East sound. Australian singer Deni Hines was hired to provide backing vocals on one of the album's singles, "Not Enough Time", and the track "Strange Desire". The singer would go on to marry Pengilly one year later. Tim Farriss was absent during most of the album's production because he was suffering from exostosis. Pengilly had to play most of his material. Pengilly himself was recovering from the end of a ten-year relationship. Other band members were also going through eventful experiences in their lives, including drummer Jon Farriss, who was preparing to marry his girlfriend at the time, Leslie Bega, whom he had met the previous year in Los Angeles. Bassist Garry Gary Beers and his then-wife, Jodie, were awaiting the birth of their second child. In the band's 2005 official autobiography, INXS: Story to Story, Optiz recalls, "The album is very much Andrew, Michael and myself. We didn't have everyone's minds on the job because some of them were going through significant things in their personal lives".

In the midst of recording, the band were approached to headline the Concert for Life, a benefit show staged in Sydney's Centennial Park on 28 March 1992. The event was held to help raise money for the Victor Chang Cardiac Research Centre and AIDS Patient Services and Research, at St Vincent's Hospital. More than 62,000 people attended the event, with other Australian acts, including Crowded House and Jimmy Barnes headlining. For the encore, the orchestra were hired once again to help INXS perform their new song, "Baby Don't Cry", as well as "Never Tear Us Apart". The band included two more songs from the new album on their set list: "Taste It" and "All Around". Upon returning to the studio to finish the rest of the album, the band members decided not to tour in support for Welcome to Wherever You Are; instead they came up with the idea of doing a follow-up album, and then touring in support of both. Opitz went on to produce the follow-up, Full Moon, Dirty Hearts, a year later, continuing the band's experimentation with their musical style. Welcome to Wherever You Are is the first studio album to have all members of INXS share production credits.

Packaging
Previous designs for INXS releases, including Kick and X, were created by visual artist Nick Egan, and included strong shots of the band, but for the release of Welcome to Wherever You Are, INXS wanted to go for a more artistic and creative theme. A technique known as "situation photography" was used to shoot random pictures for the album's cover art, as well as the album's five singles. The album and its accompanying singles would all have the same font style and effect used for the title. The title is printed on a long, narrow piece of paper, and is coated onto the random photograph with adhesive tape.

Welcome to Wherever You Are features a different album cover on each format. The most recognised cover art is the design on CD, which features the Artane Boys Band from Ireland. Atlantic records also released a limited edition of the album on deluxe digipak. The vinyl edition featured a black & white picture of a Sea Cadet while the cassette cover features a group of boy scouts from 9th/10th Dublin Aughrim Street Scouts performing a human pyramid. The new designs were a departure from the group's previous work with Egan. With INXS missing from the artwork and lack of promotion from the record label, some fans simply wouldn't recognise the new album in record stores. A few months after the album's release, Atlantic re-released the CD edition in Australia with new artwork, this time featuring INXS. The re-printed artwork shows the band walking the desert dressed in suits. The shot was an outtake taken from the photo sessions that were included in the album sleeve.

Lyrics from all twelve songs were printed in the liner notes.

Critical reception

The album was generally positively received by the critics and fans, particularly in Europe and the UK, where it went to the top of Album charts in the UK. The Independent and Q magazine also included the album in their top 10 albums of the year of 1992. Andy Gill from The Independent said "It's their best record by some distance, bristling with pop hooks applied in odd directions." Writer Stephen Thomas Erlewine stated in his AllMusic review that the album was "one of the band's strongest." However, Vic Garbarini, for Rolling Stone, was less positive and felt "this is music that attracts but hasn't the gravity or resonance to hold your attention ... Hutchence seems dissociated from his material, dispassionately competent ... the wealth of musical gifts on the album makes the one-dimensional delivery stand out all the more dramatically".

Commercial performance
At the time of its release, Welcome to Wherever You Are entered the UK Albums Chart straight at number 1, making INXS the first Australian band to reach the top spot since AC/DC's Back in Black in 1980. The album was certified gold less than two months later by the British Phonographic Industry (BPI) for sales in excess of 100,000 units. The album charted well in other parts of Europe, reaching number 1 in Sweden, number 2 in Switzerland, number 3 in Norway and number 8 in Germany. The album attained gold status in both Sweden and Switzerland.

In the band's native Australia, the album debuted on the Australian Albums Chart at number 2 on 16 August 1992 and remained at that position for 2 weeks. In total, it remained in the Australian charts for 13 weeks. It subsequently received a gold accreditation from the Australian Recording Industry Association (ARIA) for shipments of 35,000 units. In New Zealand, the album entered at number 46 on the RIANZ Chart, eventually peaking at number 8. It was present for a total of 12 weeks on the chart.

In the United States, Welcome to Wherever You Are peaked at number 16 on the Billboard Top 200, and was first certified gold by the Recording Industry Association of America (RIAA) on 2 October 1992 for shipments of 500,000 units. Five years later, the album was certified platinum on 16 December 1997 for sales of one million copies alone in the United States. In Canada, Welcome to Wherever You Are reached number 10 on the RPM Albums Chart It received a gold accreditation by the Canadian Recording Industry Association (CRIA) on 26 March 1993 for shipments of 50,000 units.

Track listing

Personnel 
Personnel as listed in the album's liner notes are:

INXS
 Michael Hutchence – vocals
 Andrew Farriss – keyboards, guitars, orchestral arrangements (7, 12)
 Tim Farriss – guitars
 Kirk Pengilly – guitars, saxophone, vocals
 Garry Gary Beers – bass, vocals 
 Jon Farriss – drums, percussion, vocals

Additional musicians
 Sunil De Silva – percussion (5)
 Australian Concert Orchestra – orchestra (7, 12)
 Mick Kenny – orchestral arrangements (7, 12)
 Colin Piper – conductor (7, 12)
 Phillip Hartl – concertmaster (7, 12)
 Deni Hines – backing vocals (5, 11)

Production 
 Mark Opitz – producer
 INXS – producers 
 Bob Clearmountain – mixing at A&M Studios (Hollywood, California, USA)
 Niven Garland – engineer
 Melissa Van Twest – assistant engineer
 Neil Sandbach – orchestral engineer (7, 12)
 Leon Zervos – mastering at Studios 301 (Sydney, Australia)
 Chris Murphy – management
 Steve Pyke – cover photography
 Peggy Sirota – band photography 
 Michael Nash Assoc. – design

Charts and certifications

Charts

Certifications

|-

|-

|-

|-

|-

|-

!scope="row"|Worldwide (IFPI)
|
|2,000,000

References

INXS albums
1992 albums
Albums produced by Mark Opitz